Canadian-Finnish relations are foreign relations between Canada and Finland.  Diplomatic relations between them were established on November 21, 1947.  Canada has an embassy in Helsinki.  Finland has an embassy in Ottawa. There are over 143,000 Canadians with Finnish ancestry and over 2,000 Canadian immigrants living in Finland.

World War II 

On November 30, 1939, the USSR commenced an invasion of Finland. Immediately, the invasion became headline news, and the Canadian public were strongly in favor of "gallant Finland". About 250 Finnish-Canadians left Canada to defend Finland. At first, the idea of leaving Canada to fight in Finland was strongly opposed by the Canadian government. This was due to Finland being a major supporter of Nazi Germany. About 3 months later, the Canadian government completely changed their minds and rather supported the idea.

Canada also sent food supplies, clothing and blankets to accompany the Finnish-Canadian fighters, but the 250 fighters did not reach Finland before the 13th of March, when the armistice was signed.

Human rights 
Finland, like Canada, has traditionally played a very active role in promotion and protection of human rights, humanitarian assistance as well as arms control and disarmament, peacekeeping and crisis management. Over the past few years, Finland has demonstrated particular interest in Canada's human security policies (including responsibility to protect), and increasingly on the "Canadian model of multiculturalism".

Trade
Prior to the economic downturn, Canadian merchandise exports to Finland experienced vast increases - from (CAD) $473.9 million in 2006 to $1.0 billion in 2008. In 2010, exports to Finland plummeted to $400.9 million. In 2012, exports totaled at $423.6 million, showing a slight increase.

Canada's main exports to Finland are mineral fuels and oil (not crude), machinery, pharmaceutical products, and vehicles. In 2012, Canadian merchandise imports totalled $1.046 billion, down from $1.074 billion in 2010.

Investment 
Finland is a large investor in Canada and a priority market for investment attraction. In 2010, direct investment from Finland in Canada was officially listed at $1.1 billion, making Finland Canada's 18th largest investor. Major Finnish investors in Canada include Nokia, Metso, Wihuri, Kemira, and others. In the same year, Canadian direct investment in Finland was officially listed as $152 million. Canadian companies active in Finland include Bombardier, CGI, Exfo, InMet and First Quantum Minerals. Canada's mining presence in Finland is estimated at over (CAD) $1 billion in cumulative mining assets.

Arctic Relations

Canada–Finland relations on Arctic issues are strong. Addressing these issues is normally done through the Arctic Council, as both countries believe it to be the leading way of cooperation on Arctic issues.

Canadian mining companies have a large presence in northern Finland. Roughly one third of all Finnish mines are Canadian-owned. Canadian companies are the largest employer in Lapland.

See also 
 Foreign relations of Canada
 Foreign relations of Finland
 Canada–European Union relations
 Finnish Canadians

References

External links 
  Canadian Ministry of Foreign Affairs and International Trade about relations with Finland
  Ministry for Foreign Affairs of Finland about relations with Canada

 

 
Finland 
Bilateral relations of Finland